The Huuchid (Khalkha-Mongolian: Хуучид/Huuchid; ; "The old/ancient ones") are a power clan of the Chahar . The name probably derives from Mongolian word "huuchin," meaning "old/aged."

See also 

 Demographics of China
 List of medieval Mongolian tribes and clans
 Southern Mongolian dialect

Mongols
Southern Mongols